Joseph Onoja (born 6 November 1998) is a Nigerian professional footballer who plays for Rivers United.

With Rivers United, the central midfielder won the 2021/2022 Nigeria Professional Football League title.

His performances for his club earned him a national team call up to represent the country's Super Eagles B team in the 2022/2023 African Nations Championship qualifiers.

He made his debut for Nigeria on the 28 August 2022 against Ghana in Cape Coast.

Apart from being a central midfielder, Onoja is versatile and can play multiple position. He has been seen to play in the defensive midfield, left side of the midfield and attacking midfield position.

Career 

In 2019 season, Onoja joined Gombe United but left the same season for Heartland FC before moving to the Portharcourt-based side, Rivers United.

Onoja has represented Rivers United in the CAF Champions League. Onoja put in a good shift in the first leg of their CAF Champions League second preliminary round against Wydad Casablanca. His side come from behind to beat the Moroccans 2–1 in that game.

Honours 
 Nigeria Professional League title: 2021/2022

References 

Living people
Nigerian footballers
1998 births